Bobby Lounge (born Dub Brock, 1950) is an American singer-songwriter from McComb, Mississippi, United States. Lounge began playing for house parties while attending Louisiana Tech University in northern Louisiana in the mid 1970s. In the 1980s, Lounge played a handful of shows at Ruby's Roadhouse in Mandeville, Louisiana. He stopped playing professionally for many years while he battled chronic fatigue syndrome. He launched a comeback from a short lived career when he appeared on stage at the 2005 New Orleans Jazz and Heritage Festival, Tipitina's, and the New Orleans House of Blues.  That performance was enthusiastically received and subsequently glowing reviews appeared in Rolling Stone, The New York Times, Living Blues, Blues Review, Down Beat, USA Today and other magazines and newspapers.

He has released four albums for the small Abitian record label, I Remember The Night Your Trailer Burned Down, Ten Foot Woman, Bobby's Back in Town Live, and Somethin's Wrong.

Discography
I Remember the Night Your Trailer Burned Down (2005)
Ten Foot Woman (2006)
Bobby's Back in Town Live (2008)
Somethin's Wrong (2008)

References

External links
 BobbyLounge.com Authorized website

Living people
People from McComb, Mississippi
People with chronic fatigue syndrome
American blues singers
American blues singer-songwriters
Blues musicians from Mississippi
Singer-songwriters from Mississippi
American blues pianists
American male pianists
1950 births
Louisiana Tech University alumni
20th-century American pianists
21st-century American pianists
20th-century American male musicians
21st-century American male musicians
American male singer-songwriters